"Soundtrack to Summer" is a song by New Zealand boy band Titanium. It was released in 2013 and features vocals from Jupiter Project.

Background and release
The song was released to radio in New Zealand on 1 March 2013. The single was released to radio in the United States in May 2013.

Music video
The official music video premiered via YouTube on February 28, 2013. To date the video has reached over 15,000 views.
It's an up tempo music video directed by Craig Gainsbough and Adam King, who shot the video on a historic 70 ft classic schooner called Haparanda.

Live performances
Titanium performed this single live on What Now and on The Erin Simpson Show.

Charts and certifications  
The song charted and peaked at number thirty-one for only one week on the New Zealand Singles Chart.

References 

Titanium (band) songs
2013 singles
Warner Music Group singles
2013 songs